Kurdish literature is literature written in the Kurdish languages. Literary Kurdish works have been written in each of the four main languages: Zaza, Gorani, Kurmanji and Sorani. Ali Hariri  (1009–1079) is one of the first well-known poets who wrote in Kurdish. He was from the Hakkari region.

Zazaki - Gorani literature 

Some of the well-known Gorani language poets and writers are Mele Perîşan (1356–1431), Shaykh Mustafa Takhtayi, Mistefa Bêsaranî (1642–1701), Muhammad Kandulayi (late 17th century), Khana Qubadi (1700–1759), Shayda Awrami (1784–1852) and Mastoureh Ardalan) (1805–1848). Zazaki and Gorani which was the literary languages of much of what today is known as Iraqi, Turkish and Iranian Kurdistan, is classified as a member of the Zaza–Gorani branch of the Northwestern Iranian languages.

Kurmanji literature 

A Yezidi religious work, the Meshefa Reş, is in a classic form of Kurmanji and it has been conjectured that it was written sometime in the 13th century. However, it has been argued that the work was actually written as late as the 20th century by non-Yazidi authors seeking to summarise the beliefs of Yezidis in a form similar to that of the holy scriptures of other religions.

Mela Hesenê Bateyî (1417–1495) from Hakkâri, who wrote the author of Mawlud, a collection of verse and an anthology;
Salim Salman, author of Yûsif û Zuleyxa in 1586;
Melayê Cizîrî (1570–1640) from Bohtan region, the famous sufi poet. His collection of poems contains more than 2,000 verses
Ahmad Khani (1651–1707), the author of Mam and Zin, a long poem of 2,650 distichs, is probably the best known and most popular of the classical Kurdish poets.

Sorani literature 

In contrast to Kurmanji, literary works in Sorani were not abundant before the late 18th century and early 19th century. Although many poets Nalî have written in Sorani, but it was only after him that Sorani became an important dialect in writing. Nalî was the first poet to write a diwan in this dialect. Others, such as Salim and Kurdi, wrote in Sorani in the early 19th century as well. Haji Qadir Koyi of Koy Sanjaq in central Kurdistan (1817–1897), and Sheikh Reza Talabani (1835–1909) also wrote in Sorani dialect after Nalî. The closeness of the two dialects of Sorani and Kurmanji is cited as one of the reasons for the late start in Sorani literature, as well as the fact that during 15th to 19th century, there was a rich literary tradition in the Kurmanji dialect. Furthermore the presence of the Gorani dialect as a literary language and its connection to Yarsanism and Ardalan dynasty was another reason that people did not produce texts in Sorani.

A historical list of Kurdish literature and poets

Religious
Mishefa Reş, The religious book of the Êzidî (Yezidi) Kurds. (in French) It is held to have been written by Shaykh Hasan (born  AD 1195), a nephew of Shaykh Adi ibn Musâfir, the sacred prophet of the Yezidis. However, it has been argued that it was actually written in the 20th century by Kurds who were not themselves Yezidis.
 Serencam, The book of Yarsan.

Goranî dialect
 Balool (9th century)
 Mala Pareshan (14th century)
 Khana Qubadi (Xana Qubadî) (1700–1759),
 Sarhang Almas Khan (17th and 18th century)
 Mastoureh Ardalan (Mestûrey Erdelan) (1805–1848)
 Mawlawi Tawagozi (Mewlewî Tawegozî) (1806–1882)

Famous poets in Kurmancî dialect
 Mela Hesenê Bateyî (Melayê Bateyî) (1417–1491) of Hekkarî, the author of Mewlûda Kurmancî (Birthday in Kurmanji), a collection of poems.
 Melayê Cizîrî (Mela Ehmedê Cizîrî) (1570–1640) of Buhtan region, poet and sufi. 
 Faqi Tayran (Feqiyê Teyran) (1590–1660) Student of Melayê Cezîrî. He is credited for contributing the earliest literary account of the Battle of Dimdim in 1609–1610 between Kurds and Safavid Empire. 
 Ahmad Khani (Ehmedê Xanî) (1651–1707) (The epic drama of Mem û Zîn) (Born in Hakkari, Turkey)
 Mehmûd Bayazîdî (Mahmud Bayazidi), (1797–1859) Kurdish writer.

Soranî dialect
 Nalî (1798–1855)
 Haji Qadir Koyi (Hacî Qadir Koyî) (1817–1897)
 Sheikh Rezza Talabani (Şêx Reza Talebanî) (1835–1910)
 Mahwi (1830–1906)
 Wafaei (1844–1902)

Kurdish poets and writers of the 20th century

 Nari Mela Kake Heme (1874–1944) Poet, born and died in Marivan.
 Piramerd or Pîremêrd (Tewfîq Beg Mehmûd Axa) (1867–1950) Poet, Writer, Playwright and Journalist.
 Celadet Alî Bedirxan (1893–1951) Writer, journalist and linguist. Creator of the modern Kurmanji alphabet.
 Arab Shamilov (Erebê Şemo) (1897–1978). Kurdish novelist in Armenia.
 Cigerxwîn or Cegerxwîn (Jigarkhwin) (Sheikmous Hasan) (1903–1984) poet, born in Mardin, Ottoman. Died in Sweden.
 Abdulla Goran (1904–1962). The founder of modern Kurdish poetry.
 Osman Sabri (1905–1993) Kurdish poet, writer and journalist, Turkey/Syria.
 Nado Makhmudov (1907–1990) Kurdish writer and public figure, Armenia.
 Hemin Mukriyani (Hêmin Mukriyanî) (1920–1986) Poet and Journalist, Iran.
 Hejar (Abdurrahman Sharafkandi) (1920–1990), Poet, Writer, Translator and Linguist, Iran.
 Jamal Nebez (born 1933) Writer, Linguist, Translator and Academic, Germany.
 Sherko Bekas (Şêrko Bêkes) (born 1940) Poet, Iraqi Kurdistan. His poems have been translated to over 10 languages.
 Latif Halmat (Letîf Helmet) (born 1947), Poet, Iraqi Kurdistan.
 Abdulla Pashew (Ebdulla Peşêw) (born 1947), Poet.
 Alan Rubar (born 1948) Poet and translator. Born in Irani Kurdistan, Sardasht. 
 Salim Barakat (born 1951) Poet, Writer, and Novelist.
 Rafiq Sabir (born 1950) Poet, Sweden.
 Mehmed Uzun (1953–2007), Contemporary Writer and Novelist.
 Firat Cewerî (born 1959), Contemporary Writer and Novelist.
 Jan Dost (born 1965), writer and novelist
 İbrahim Halil Baran (born 1981), Poet, writer and designer.
 Azad Zal (born 1972), Writer-journalist-translator-poet-linguist and lexicographer
 Suwara Ilkhanizada (1937–1976), Among the first poets that composed modern poems in Kurdistan.

Kurdish poets and writers of the 21st century
Bachtyar Ali (1960-), Novelist from Slemani, Iraqi Kurdistan
Behrouz Boochani (1983-), Novelist from Ilam, Iran

References

External links
PHILIP G. KREYENBROEK, "Kurdish Written Literature", Encyclopedia Iranica
[ T. Bois, Kurdish Folklore and Literature, Part VI of Kurds and Kurdistan], Encyclopaedia of Islam.

 
Iranic literature
Kurdish culture
Kurdish language
Literature by ethnicity